Kashka-Suu is a village in Osh Region of Kyrgyzstan. It is part of the Chong-Alay District. Its population was 3,468 in 2021.

References

Populated places in Osh Region